The Anglican Communion does not have a centralised canon law of its own, unlike the canon law of the Catholic Church.  Each of the autonomous member churches of the communion, however, does have a canonical system.  Some, such as the Church of England, has an ancient, highly developed canon law while others, such as the Episcopal Church in the United States have more recently developed canonical systems originally based on the English canon law.

Unlike the system of canon law in the Church of England, which continues to be drawn from the canon law of the Western church, English ecclesiastical law did not remain in force in the Episcopal Church after the American Revolution. There are two parallel systems of canon law within the church operating on a national level, governed by the General Convention, and on a diocesan level, with each diocesan convention empowered to create constitutions and canons. Diocesan constitutions do not require the approval of the General Convention. The Episcopal Church is notable among Anglican churches for the extent to which the Constitution and Canons of the General Convention leave matters to regulation at the diocesan and parochial levels.

Constitution and Canons of the Episcopal Church in the United States
links at Constitution and Canons page
 White and Dykman treatise on Canon Law in the Episcopal Church

List of Diocesan Constitutions and Canons

See also

Canon law of the Anglican Communion
Ecclesiastical court

References

Sources

Further reading
 

Episcopal Church (United States)
Anglican theology and doctrine
Canon law of the Anglican Communion